Siemień  is a village in Parczew County, Lublin Voivodeship, in eastern Poland. It is the seat of the gmina (administrative district) called Gmina Siemień.

The village has a population of 581.

References

Villages in Parczew County